Harz Roller is the name of a breed of domestic canary bred in the Upper Harz mountains of Germany. The birds were bred in the Upper Harz between Lautenthal and Sankt Andreasberg in the middle of the 19th century and achieved European-wide fame. Since 2001 there has been a Harz Roller Museum in Sankt Andreasberg.	

By patient breeding, a breed of canary was able to be produced that had a pleasant, melodious song, full of variety and delivered with an apparently closed beak.  Different types of canaries can breed with each other, especially including the Harz Roller and the Spanish Timbrado.

Miner's canary

The breeding and sale of this popular breed of canary was an important secondary occupation for mining people, as was the making of cages for the birds. In the second half of the 19th century, the breeding and sale of these canaries boomed. In contrast to widespread legend, the birds were not used in the mines to indicate the presence of carbon monoxide; they were too valuable. The Harz miners used captured wild birds for that purpose.

The birds were used as a warning system against used air (German: Matte Wetter), i.e. to indicate the presence of poisonous gases such as carbon monoxide and low levels of oxygen in the surrounding air. Canaries were especially good for this purpose as, unlike finches, doves and mice, they reacted very quickly to carbon monoxide. While a mouse would not have a noticeable reaction until after up to 70 minutes to a carbon monoxide concentration of 0.77 % in the air, a canary will fall off its perch after as little as 2.5 minutes from a concentration of 0.29 %. For this reason, canaries were not only used in normal operations, but especially to protect rescue units in the case of an accident.

The hens were less suitable for sale, as only the cocks, as part of their courtship behaviour, were able to sing the popular song. Since only a few hens were needed for breeding, the remaining birds, as well as wild birds caught for this purpose, could be used as warning devices in the mines.

See also
 Wilhelm Trute - breeder
 Domestic canary
 Atlantic canary (wild canary)
 Australian plainhead
 Red factor canary
 Birdcage

References

External links 

 Harz Roller Museum in Sankt Andreasberg
 Western Roller Canary Association

Mining in the Harz
Bird breeds
Serinus